Rocky View County is a municipal district in southern Alberta, Canada that is named for its views of the nearby Rocky Mountains to the west. It surrounds most of Calgary, forming the city's northern boundary and most of the city's western and eastern boundaries.  At a population of 41,028 in 2021, Rocky View County is the most populous municipal district in Alberta. Though predominantly rural in nature, Rocky View County is home to 14 hamlets, including Langdon, one of Alberta's most populous hamlets. Its rural areas are home to numerous country residential subdivisions.

History 
The Municipal District (MD) of Calgary No. 44 was originally formed on January 1, 1955 from part of Improvement District No. 46 and parts of five municipal districts – the MD of Serviceberry No. 43, the MD of Conrich No. 44, the MD of Springbank No. 45, the MD of Kneehill No. 48, and the MD of Mountain View No. 49. The MD of Calgary No. 44 was renamed the MD of Rocky View No. 44 on January 9, 1956.

"Rocky View" was the successful entry selected in December 1955 in a local competition to rename the newly formed municipal district. The entry was submitted by Leslie Burwash of Balzac. "Bow View" and "Chinook" placed second and third respectively in the competition. The name "Rocky View" was successful due to its descriptive nature as most areas within the MD of Rocky View No. 44 have views of the Rocky Mountains to the west. 

The MD of Rocky View No. 44 changed its name to Rocky View County on June 24, 2009.

On July 28, 2020, Rocky View County applied to the Province of Alberta to change its municipal classification from an MD to a Specialized Municipality, like Strathcona County near Edmonton.  This request was subsequently denied by the Province.

Geography

Communities and localities 

 
The following urban municipalities border Rocky View County.
Cities
Airdrie
Chestermere 
Towns
Cochrane
Crossfield
Irricana
Villages
Beiseker
Summer villages
none

The following hamlets are located within Rocky View County.
Hamlets
Balzac 
Bottrel
Bragg Creek
Cochrane Lake
Conrich
Dalemead
Dalroy
Delacour
Indus
Janet
Kathyrn
Keoma
Langdon
Madden

The following localities are located within Rocky View County.
Localities 
 
Allandale Estates
Anatapy
Artists View East Subdivision
Artists View Park West (designated place) or Artists View West Subdivision
Banded Peak Place
Bearspan Heights
Bearspaw
Bennett
Braemore Ranch
Caldbeck
Calling Horse Estates
Camp Gardner
Circle Five
Colpitts Ranch Subdivision
Country Estates
Craigdhu
Croxford Estates
Cullen Creek
Deerwood Estates
Del-Rich Meadows
Elbow River Estates
Elk Valley Park
Entheos West
Fawnhill
Garden Heights
Georgian Estates
Ghost Dam
Glenbow
Green Valley Place
Helmsdale
High Point Estates (designated place)
Idlewood Estates
Inverlake
Kersey
Lake Erie Estates
Lansdowne Estates
Livingstone Estates
Mitford
Mount View Estates
Mountain View Estates
Murray Acres Estates
Nier
Norfolk
O'Neil Ranchettes
Partridge Place
Pinebrook Estates
Pirmez Creek
Prairie Royale
Radnor
River Ridge Estates
Robertson
Rocky View
Rolling Range Estates
Rosewood
Springbank Meadows
Springgate Estates
Springland Estates
Springshire Estates
Toki Estates
Tower Ridge Estates
West Bluff Road Subdivision
Wild Rose Country Estates
Wildcat
Williams Subdivision
Wintergreen

Other places

Bearspaw-Glendale (country residential area)
Elbow Valley (country residential area)
Harmony (urban community)
Heritage Woods (designated place)
Springbank (country residential area)

Demographics 

In the 2016 Census of Population conducted by Statistics Canada, Rocky View County had a population of 39,407 living in 13,042 of its 13,620 total private dwellings, a  change from its 2011 population of 35,754.

Rocky View County's 2013 municipal census counted a population of 38,055, a 6.4% increase over its adjusted 2011 federal census population of 35,754. Its previous 2006 municipal census counted a population of 34,597.

Attractions 
Big Hill Springs Provincial Park 
Bragg Creek Community Centre and historic downtown
Bragg Creek Provincial Park   
Calaway Park
Century Downs Racetrack and Casino
CrossIron Mills
Glenbow Ranch Provincial Park
Pioneer Acres Museum

Government

Municipal 
Rocky View County has a council consisting of elected officials representing seven electoral divisions. Municipal elections, organized under the Alberta Elections Act from Alberta Municipal Affairs, are held every four years, the last being in October, 2021.

Each October, the councillors elect a mayor and a deputy mayor from among their number.

The Rocky View Council consists of:
Kevin Hanson - Division 1: Southwest Rocky View County - Elbow Valley, Bragg Creek
Don Kochan, Mayor - Division 2: West Rocky View County - Springbank
Crystal Kissel, Deputy Mayor - Division 3: West Rocky View County - Cochrane Lake, South Bearspaw, Glendale
Samanntha Wright - Division 4: Northwest Rocky View County - North Bearspaw, Bottrell, Madden
Greg Boehlke - Division 5: Northeast Rocky View County - Kathryn, Keoma, surrounding Airdrie and Crossfield
Sunny Samra - Division 6: East Rocky View County - Conrich, Dalroy, Indus, Janet
Al Schule - Division 7: Hamlet of Langdon

Provincial 
Rocky View County is served by the Provincial Electoral Divisions of Airdrie, Chestermere-Rocky View and Olds-Didsbury-Three Hills.

Rocky View is currently represented in the Alberta Legislature by MLA Angela Pitt in the riding of Airdrie, Leela Sharon Aheer in Chestermere-Rocky View and Nathan Cooper in Olds-Didsbury-Three Hills.

Federal 
Rocky View is served by three Federal Electoral Divisions: Crowfoot, Macleod and Wild Rose.

Rocky View's northeast and southeast (east of Calgary, north of the Bow River) is part of the Federal Electoral district (also known as a riding) of Crowfoot. This riding has been represented by Kevin Sorenson, who was originally elected as a member of the Reform Party then again as a member of the Canadian Alliance and currently of the Conservative Party.

Rocky View's southwest (south of the Bow River and west of Calgary) is part of the Federal Electoral district (also known as a riding) of Macleod. This riding has been represented by Ted Menzies, who was originally elected as a member of the Canadian Alliance and currently of the Conservative Party.

Rocky View's northwest is part of the Federal Electoral district (also known as a riding) of Wild Rose. This riding is represented by Blake Richards, who was elected as a member of the Conservative Party on October 14, 2008.

Rocky View and the Calgary Region are also represented by Senator Elaine McCoy was appointed to the Senate of Canada (the Upper House) by Prime Minister Paul Martin on March 24, 2005.

Infrastructure

Transportation 
Highways
Rocky View County is bisected by the Trans-Canada Highway (Highway 1) and Highway 2. Highway 9, a major transportation route between Calgary and Saskatoon, Saskatchewan, also bisects the eastern portion of Rocky View County.

Railways
The main lines of the Canadian Pacific Railway (CPR) and the Canadian National Railway (CNR) between Calgary and Edmonton travel through Rocky View County. The CPR main line is routed through the City of Airdrie and the Town of Crossfield, while the CNR main line is routed through the Town of Irricana and the Village of Beiseker.

Airports
Two airports are located within Rocky View County – Beiseker Airport and Springbank Airport.

See also 
List of communities in Alberta
List of municipal districts in Alberta

References

External links 

 
Calgary Region
Municipal districts in Alberta